FC Dynamo Luhansk was a Ukrainian football team based in Luhansk, Ukraine.

Brief history 
FC Dynamo Luhansk was founded somewhen between the 1920s–1930s. The club began its legacy in the Soviet football competitions and by the 1950s lost its professional status. Dozen years later it folded. Its games the club played on the Lenin Memorial Stadium. In 1991 it was ressuracted and with the independence of Ukraine, FC Dinamo Luhansk joined the Ukrainian football competitions. The club played its games in the Third and Second Leagues on the Stadium of "Avantguard". In 1995 it merged with FC Metalurh Mariupol.

Awards 
The first out of provincially based teams reached the USSR Cup Quarter Finals in 1947.

League and Cup history

External links 
 History of Ukrainian Football (ukrsoccerhistory.com) (Dynamo Luhansk)

 
Defunct football clubs in Ukraine
Football clubs in Luhansk
Association football clubs established in 1930
Association football clubs disestablished in 1995
1930 establishments in Ukraine
1995 disestablishments in Ukraine
Dynamo (Ukraine)